Irish Citylink is an Irish based subsidiary of Singaporean company ComfortDelGro, which provides bus services between some of Ireland's major cities and towns.

History 

In 2010, Citylink contracted the running of its bus services to Callinan Coaches while remaining in control of sales and marketing of its routes.

From midnight on the 30 March 2020 Citylink cancelled all its Irish bus services indefinitely as a response to the Covid-19 pandemic. Services resumed on 31 July 2020 with busses operating at reduced capacity in line with National Transport Authority guidelines.

Services 
As of May 2017, Citylink operates on six routes:
 Galway – Dublin City non-stop express
 Galway – Dublin Airport non-stop express (branded as eireagle)
 Galway – Limerick – Cork – Cork Airport express (Route 251)
 Galway – Clifden (Route 923)
 Galway – Ballinasloe – Athlone – Dublin commuter (Route 763)
 Limerick – Dublin Airport eireagle (Route 712X)

Legal prosecution 

In April 2010, Citylink were prosecuted for operating an unlicensed bus service between Dublin and Galway when, in addition to their licensed stopping bus service, they introduced a non-stop service between the two cities. While the District Court judge found that the case against the company had been proven to the required degree, she decided to apply the Probation Act.

See also 
 Aircoach
 Scottish Citylink

References

External links 
 Company website

ComfortDelGro companies
Public transport in the Republic of Ireland
Bus companies of the Republic of Ireland
Transport companies established in 1994
Irish companies established in 1994